Timothy William Leggatt  is an English author, and academic and media consultant. Leggatt worked for the P&O Steam Navigation Company in Calcutta, India, 1958–1959. He was senior tutor at King's College, Cambridge, 1973–1981. He was a planning controller at The Royal Shakespeare Company, London and Stratford in 1984-1988. He also acted in theater including Wild Honey in 2001.

Books 

 New Commonwealth students in Britain: with special reference to students from East Africa /P.E.P., Political and Economic Planning 1965.
 Sociological Theory and Survey Research: Institutional Change and Social Policy in Great Britain, Sage Publications, 1974 (Edited).
 The Evolution of Industrial Systems, Croom Helm, 1985; republished by Routledge 2019.
 Connecting with E. M. Forster: A Memoir, Hesperus Press, 2012.

References 

English writers
English male stage actors
Living people
1933 births